The 1923 College Basketball All-Southern Team consisted of basketball players from the South chosen at their respective positions.

Composite team

All-Southerns

Guards
K. P. Gatchell, Mississippi A&M (W)
George Harmon, Mercer
Yarnell Barnes, Chattanooga

Forwards
Consuello Smith, Mercer (W)
Baby Roane, Georgia Tech (W [as g])
H. G. Perkins, Mississippi A&M (W)
Rhodes, VPI

Center
Bill Redd, Chattanooga (W)

Key
W = selected by writers attending the SoCon tournament.

References

All-Southern